Thavalakuppam is a panchayat village in Ariyankuppam Commune in the Union Territory of Puducherry, India. It is also a revenue village under Ariyankuppam Firka.

Geography 
Thavalakuppam is bordered by Sankaraparani River in the north, Pooranankuppam in the east,  periyakattupalayam(Tamil Nadu) in the south and Abishegapakkam in the West

Demographics 
 India census, Thavalakuppam had a population of 5670. Males constitute 50% of the population and females 50%. Thavalakuppam has an average literacy rate of 81.49%, male literacy is 88.89%, and female literacy is 74.13%. In Thavalakuppam, 10% of the population is under 6 years of age.

Transport 
Thavalakuppam is located at 11° 52′N 79° 47′E. Thavalakuppam is at 7.5 km from Pondicherry city and 3.5 km from Ariyankuppam.  It is in between Pondicherry  and Cuddalore on NH-45A. One can reach Thavalakuppam by any local bus from Pondicherry to Bahoor, Madukarai and Karaiyanputtur running via Ariyankuppam.

Road Network 
The following are main roads in Thavalakuppam

 National Highway - 45A
 Thavalakuppam - Embalam Highway (RC-20)
 Pudukuppam Road
 Nallavadu Road

Tourism

Singirikudi Lakshminarashimhar Koil 
Singirikudi Lakshminarashimhar Koil is located atAbishegapakkam,2 km from Thavalakuppam on Thavalakuppam - Embalam Highway (RC-20). Singirikudi is famous for the Ugira Narashimhar.
The presiding deity is approximately eight feet tall.  Here Lord Narasimha swamy appears in the posture of killing Hiranya Kasibu.  The Presiding deity has 8+8 = 16 hands.  Here the pooja is conducted according to Vaikhanasa agamam.  The exact date of construction of this temple is not known.

Jalakandeswarar Temple
Jalakandeswarar temple is residing at Edayarplayam village. This temple has a Shiva lingam. It is nearly 5 feet height. The name of the temple came due to its neighborly pond(Jalam kanda Eeswarar). For all Pradosham the people will gather here to worship. On the olden days the Shiva lingam is located under the neem tree. Then people established a temple. During the time of construction of the temple two ruthratcham chain found, under the ground. Now they were put on to the shiva lingam.

Villages under Thavalakuppam Village Panchayat 
 Thavalakuppam
 Edayarpalayam
 Nanamedu

Politics 
Thavakuppam is part of Manavely (State Assembly Constituency) which comes under Pondicherry (Lok Sabha constituency)

References

External links
Official website of the Government of the Union Territory of Puducherry

Villages in Puducherry district
Ariyankuppam